Kalancheri is a village in the Papanasam taluk of Thanjavur district, Tamil Nadu, India.

Demographics 

As per the 2001 census, Kalancheri had a total population of 1006 with 477 males and 529 females. The sex ratio was 110.9. The literacy rate was 74.05.

References 

 

Villages in Thanjavur district